Peter David Leebrook (born 18 September 1968) was an English professional footballer who played as a full back. He played more than 50 matches in the Football League for Burnley.

Upon retiring as a professional player, Leebrook emigrated to Arizona and was involved with soccer there for 15 years. He then moved to Halifax, Canada to be Technical Director of Halifax City Soccer Club of Nova Scotia, having previously been the club's first team manager. Since then he has moved back to Phoenix, Arizona as is again involved with SC Del Sol as their Assistant Director of Coaching.

References

1968 births
Living people
Aldershot F.C. players
English expatriate sportspeople in Canada
English expatriate sportspeople in the United States
Burnley F.C. players
English expatriates in Canada
English footballers
English emigrants to the United States
Association football defenders
People from Saltburn-by-the-Sea
Sportspeople from Arizona
English Football League players
Footballers from North Yorkshire
Rugby Town F.C. players